Shepard's Prayer is  attributed to Mercury Seven astronaut Alan B. Shepard, the first American in space. It is usually quoted as "Dear Lord, please don't let me fuck up", although Shepard claimed the words to be "Don't fuck up, Shepard".

Notes

Project Mercury